The Dallas Open Tournament was a professional golf event in Texas played only in 1926.

It was held in late January at Cedar Crest Country Club, south of central Dallas, and was won by Macdonald Smith at 298, three strokes ahead of runner-up Al Espinosa. The winner's share of the purse was $800.

See also
Dallas Open, PGA Tour event since 1944

References

Former PGA Tour events
Golf in Texas
Sports in Dallas